Gone Baby Gone is a 2007 American crime thriller film directed by Ben Affleck, in his directorial debut. Affleck co-wrote the screenplay with Aaron Stockard based on the 1998 novel of the same name by Dennis Lehane. The film stars Casey Affleck and Michelle Monaghan as two Boston private investigators hunting for a young girl abducted from her single mother's apartment in Dorchester. The supporting cast includes Morgan Freeman, Ed Harris, and Amy Ryan. It was the final film to be released by The Ladd Company before its closure.

Released on October 19, 2007, Gone Baby Gone was well-received by critics and grossed $34 million worldwide against a $19 million budget. Ben Affleck was lauded for his directing debut by critics, while Amy Ryan received an Oscar nomination for Best Supporting Actress.

Plot 

In Dorchester, Boston, P.I. Patrick Kenzie and his partner and girlfriend Angie Gennaro witness a televised plea by Helene McCready for the return of her abducted four-year-old daughter Amanda and the girl's favorite doll, Mirabelle. Amid a media frenzy, Amanda's aunt Bea and uncle Lionel hire Kenzie and Gennaro to find her.

Using his connections with various criminals, Patrick discovers that Helene and her boyfriend Ray are addicts and drug mules for a local Haitian drug lord named Cheese, and had recently stolen $130,000 from him. After discovering Ray has been murdered by Cheese's men, Patrick and Angie join police detectives Remy Bressant and Nick Poole in a plan to find Amanda, who they assume has been taken by Cheese. Helene reveals she buried the money in Ray’s backyard and tearfully makes Patrick promise to her that he will bring Amanda home alive.

Patrick meets with Cheese and tries to negotiate the return of the stolen money in exchange for Amanda, but Cheese denies any involvement in the girl's disappearance. The following day, Captain Jack Doyle reads Patrick a telephone transcript of Cheese calling into the station to set up an exchange for Amanda. The exchange at a nearby quarry is botched after a gunfight breaks out, and Cheese is killed. It is believed that Amanda fell in the quarry's pond and drowned; her doll is retrieved from the water by Angie and returned to Helene. Doyle, whose own daughter was killed years before, goes into early retirement following public outcry over the mishap.

Two months later, a seven-year-old boy is abducted in Everett, and Patrick receives information that he was taken by Corwin Earle, a known child molester, who is living with two married cocaine addicts. Patrick gains entry into the house and after observing evidence of the abducted boy, returns with Remy and Nick late at night to rescue him. Before they enter the house, the woman starts shooting and fatally wounds Nick before chasing Patrick into Corwin's room. Patrick discovers the dead child and he executes Corwin as Remy arrives and kills the woman. The following evening, an intoxicated Remy tries to alleviate Patrick's guilt and confides that he once planted evidence on an abusive husband to help the man's family escape with Ray's help. Patrick recalls that Remy had originally told him that he didn't know Ray.

Following Nick's funeral, Patrick speaks to a police officer named Devin and tells him that Remy lied to him about knowing Ray. Devin tells him that Remy and Doyle knew about Cheese's stolen money before Cheese even knew it was missing. Patrick goads Lionel into meeting him in a bar and pieces together that Lionel and Remy had conspired to stage a fake kidnapping in order to take the drug money for themselves and to teach Helene a lesson, which Lionel finally admits. Remy enters the bar wearing a mask, staging a robbery to interrupt their conversation. Patrick realizes that Remy plans to kill them so he yells aloud that Remy kidnapped Amanda. The bartender shoots Remy twice in the back. Remy flees, pursued by Patrick to the rooftop of a nearby building, where he dies from his wounds.

Patrick is questioned by the police and realizes Doyle is involved when he learns that the police don't use phone transcripts. Arriving at Doyle's home, Patrick and Angie find Amanda alive and well. Doyle admits he was part of the kidnapping and helped set up the fake exchange to frame Cheese. Patrick threatens to call the authorities, but Doyle tries to convince him that Amanda will have a better life with him instead of with  her neglectful mother. Patrick discusses the choice with Angie who says she will hate Patrick if he returns Amanda to her mother. However, Patrick calls the police to collect Amanda, as he cannot bring himself to break his promise to Helene and believes she belongs with her mother, regardless of Helene's parenting. Doyle and Lionel are arrested, and Patrick and Angie break up.

Patrick later visits Helene as she is preparing for a date. He learns that she has not made appropriate plans for a babysitter, so he volunteers to watch Amanda. After Helene leaves, Patrick sits down and asks Amanda about her doll Mirabelle, but Amanda says the doll's name is Anabelle. Patrick sits in silence, realizing Helene did not even know the name of her daughter's favorite doll, and that he might have made a mistake by bringing her back in that toxic household.

Cast 

 Casey Affleck as Patrick Kenzie
 Michelle Monaghan as Angie Gennaro
 Morgan Freeman as Captain Jack Doyle
 Ed Harris as Detective Sergeant Remy Bressant
 John Ashton as Detective Nick Poole
 Amy Ryan as Helene McCready
 Madeline O'Brien as Amanda McCready
 Amy Madigan as Beatrice "Bea" McCready
 Titus Welliver as Lionel McCready
 Slaine as Bubba Rogowski
 Edi Gathegi as Cheese
 Matthew Maher as Corwin Earle
 Mark Margolis as Leon Trett
 Michael K. Williams as Devin Amronklin

Production 
Filming took place on site in Boston (mainly South Boston) and extras were often local passers-by. Other locations used include the former Quincy Quarries.

Release 
Released on October 19, 2007, the film grossed $20.3 million in the U.S. and Canada and $14.3 million in other territories, for a worldwide total of $34.6 million against its $19 million budget.

The UK release was originally set for December 28, 2007, but was pushed back to June 6, 2008, due to the disappearance of Madeleine McCann. The Malaysian release was originally set for September 20, 2007, but was postponed to March 27, 2008, due to the kidnapping and murder of eight-year-old Nurin Jazlin.

Reception

Critical response 
Review aggregator Rotten Tomatoes reports that 95% of 182 critics gave the film positive reviews, with an average rating of 7.80/10. The website's critics consensus reads: "Ben Affleck proves his directing credentials in this gripping dramatic thriller, drawing strong performances from the excellent cast and bringing working-class Boston to the screen." Metacritic assigned the film an average score of 72 out of 100, based on 34 critics, indicating "generally favorable reviews".

Peter Travers of Rolling Stone raved "The brothers Affleck both emerge triumphant in this mesmerizing thriller," while the New York Post called it "a twisty, morally ambiguous and satisfying neo-noir." Patrick Radden Keefe criticized the film for overstating the case in an otherwise laudable attempt to "capture Boston in all its sordid glory," writing that "The result is not so much what Mean Streets did for New York as what Deliverance did for Appalachia."

Ryan's performance in particular was singled out for acclaim, resulting in wins for the Broadcast Film Critics Association Award for Best Supporting Actress and National Board of Review Award for Best Supporting Actress, as well as nominations for the Academy Award, Golden Globe Award, and Screen Actors Guild Award.

In an issue of Vrij Nederland, Dutch critic and writer Arnon Grunberg called the book good, but the movie better, saying "Gone Baby Gone might not be a perfect film, but it's definitely an important one, if only to raise the question: 'What is home?'"

Top 10 lists 
The film appeared on 65 critics' top ten lists of the best films of 2007.
 2nd – Christy Lemire, Associated Press
 4th – Ben Lyons, The Daily 10
 6th – Richard Roeper, At the Movies with Ebert & Roeper
 6th – Michael Medved, The Best and Worst of 2007
 7th – James Berardinelli, ReelViews
 8th – Noel Murray, The A.V. Club
 9th – Keith Phipps, The A.V. Club

Awards and nominations

Home media 
The film was released on DVD and Blu-ray on February 12, 2008. Extras include an audio commentary by Ben Affleck and Aaron Stockard, deleted scenes, and two behind-the-scenes featurettes. The film was released on DVD and Blu-ray in Australia on September 10, 2008, in which the ending depicts Monaghan's character imploring Affleck's character to return the child to her biological mother.

Soundtrack 
The soundtrack to Gone Baby Gone was released on October 16, 2007.

References

External links 

 
 
 
 
 
 

2007 films
2007 crime drama films
2000s mystery thriller films
2007 psychological thriller films
American crime drama films
American mystery thriller films
2000s English-language films
Films directed by Ben Affleck
American detective films
Films with screenplays by Ben Affleck
Films set in Boston
Films about child abduction in the United States
Films about children
Films about drugs
Films about grieving
Films about missing people
Films based on American novels
Films based on crime novels
Films set in Massachusetts
Films shot in Boston
Films shot in Massachusetts
American neo-noir films
Miramax films
The Ladd Company films
Films scored by Harry Gregson-Williams
Films based on works by Dennis Lehane
Fictional portrayals of the Boston Police Department
2007 directorial debut films
2000s American films